Ahmed Rahmy (born 1894, date of death unknown) was an Egyptian wrestler. He competed at the 1920 and 1924 Summer Olympics.

References

External links
 

1894 births
Year of death missing
Olympic wrestlers of Egypt
Wrestlers at the 1920 Summer Olympics
Wrestlers at the 1924 Summer Olympics
Egyptian male sport wrestlers
Place of birth missing
20th-century Egyptian people